Betsey was launched at Bristol in 1800, and sailed as a West Indiaman. American privateers captured her twice in 1813 but each time she was recaptured. She was last listed in 1825.

Career
Betsey first appeared in Lloyd's Register (LR), in the volume for 1800.

Betsey, Merryweather, master, was on her way back from St Vincents to Bristol when Argus captured Betsey some nine leagues west of Scilly. Argus sent Betsey to France, but she was retaken and came into Plymouth. Argus captured Betsey some nine leagues west of Scilly. However, she was retaken and came into Plymouth. 

Betseys second captor, in October 1813, was the privateer True Blooded Yankee. Betsey had been on her way from Bristol to Grenada when she had been captured some 100 miles from Lundy Island.

Fate
Betsey was last listed in 1825.

Notes

Citations

References
 

1800 ships
Age of Sail merchant ships of England
Ships built in Bristol
Captured ships